Jennifer Baxter (born 1976) is a Canadian actress and comedian formerly based out of Toronto and currently living in Los Angeles with her husband Mike Beaver. 

Her best-known roles include Number 9 in George A. Romero's Land of the Dead, Wanda on The Eleventh Hour, and lawyer Robin Howland on Billable Hours. She is also a well recognized face in a multitude of television commercials in Canada.

She portrayed Kelly Pitts in the pilot episode of The Game, though the role was later recast with Brittany Daniel. The CW Television Network did not provide a reason for the casting change.

Filmography

Film

Television

References

External links
 

1976 births
Living people
Actresses from Vancouver
Canadian women comedians
Canadian film actresses
Canadian television actresses
Canadian expatriate actresses in the United States
Comedians from Vancouver
Canadian sketch comedians